Kelber is a surname. Notable people with the surname include:

 Michel Kelber (1908–1996), French cinematographer
 Rudolf Kelber (born 1948), German organist, harpsichordist, conductor, and church musician
 Ulrich Kelber (born 1968), German politician

See also
 Keller (surname)
 Melber